Borja López Menéndez (born 2 February 1994) is a Spanish professional footballer who plays as a central defender for Belgian club S.V. Zulte Waregem.

He had two spells with Sporting de Gijón, totalling 81 games and two goals in Segunda División, as well as making three appearances for Rayo Vallecano in La Liga, and one for Barcelona on their way to winning the Copa del Rey in 2016–17. Abroad, he made a lone Ligue 1 appearance for Monaco, while also playing in Croatia and Belgium.

Club career

Sporting Gijón
Born in Gijón, Asturias, López was a Sporting de Gijón youth graduate. On 18 December 2011 he made his senior debut for the B side, against Getafe CF B, and he went on to play one more Segunda División B match during the season, against UB Conquense.

López made his first-team debut on 1 November 2012, featuring the full 90 minutes in a 1–0 home win over CA Osasuna in the round of 32 of the Copa del Rey. He made his Segunda División debut on the 16th, again starting but in a 2–3 home loss to SD Ponferradina.

On 31 January 2013, López was promoted to the Asturians' first team alongside Luis Hernández.

Monaco
On 2 August 2013, López signed a four-year contract with high-spending AS Monaco FC of Ligue 1 for a €2.2 million fee. He played three games for the principality team, his sole league game being 20 minutes as a substituteMarcel Tisserand in a 2–2 draw at FC Sochaux-Montbéliard on 20 October.

López was loaned to La Liga's Rayo Vallecano in late January 2014, until the end of the season. He made his debut in the competition on 29 March, starting in a 5–0 defeat at Real Madrid.

On 29 January 2015, López moved to Deportivo de La Coruña on loan until June. On 4 July, in the same situation, he joined Portuguese Primeira Liga club F.C. Arouca.

Barcelona
On 29 January 2016, López joined FC Barcelona on a two-and-a-half-year deal, and was assigned to the reserves in the third division. His first and only official appearance for the main squad took place on 30 November, when he played the entire 1–1 away draw with Hércules CF in the domestic cup.

Later career
On 30 June 2017, López switched teams and countries again after signing for HNK Hajduk Split in Croatia. On 6 August 2019, he returned to his first club Sporting on a free transfer.

López signed a three-year contract with S.V. Zulte Waregem of the Belgian First Division A in June 2022.

Career statistics

Honours
Barcelona
Copa del Rey: 2016–17

References

External links

1994 births
Living people
Spanish footballers
Footballers from Gijón
Association football defenders
La Liga players
Segunda División players
Segunda División B players
Sporting de Gijón B players
Sporting de Gijón players
Rayo Vallecano players
Deportivo de La Coruña players
FC Barcelona Atlètic players
FC Barcelona players
Ligue 1 players
AS Monaco FC players
F.C. Arouca players
Croatian Football League players
HNK Hajduk Split players
Belgian Pro League players
S.V. Zulte Waregem players
Spain youth international footballers
Spanish expatriate footballers
Expatriate footballers in Monaco
Expatriate footballers in Portugal
Expatriate footballers in Croatia
Expatriate footballers in Belgium
Spanish expatriate sportspeople in Monaco
Spanish expatriate sportspeople in Portugal
Spanish expatriate sportspeople in Croatia
Spanish expatriate sportspeople in Belgium